Taracticus ruficaudus is a robber fly in the family Asilidae ("robber flies"), in the order Diptera ("flies").

References

Further reading

External links

Asilidae
Insects described in 1930